Sergei Leonidovich Kushov (born 18 August 1977) is a former Russian professional football player.

Club career
He played 12 seasons in the Russian Football National League for 5 different teams.

References

External links
 

1977 births
Footballers from Saint Petersburg
Living people
Russian footballers
Association football midfielders
FC Baltika Kaliningrad players
FK Atlantas players
FC Salyut Belgorod players
FC Shinnik Yaroslavl players
FC Oryol players
FC Lokomotiv Saint Petersburg players
A Lyga players
Russian expatriate footballers
Expatriate footballers in Lithuania